Tom Dixon (1930 – 9 February 2003) was an Irish hurler who played as a left corner-forward for the Wexford senior team.

Dixon made his first appearance for the team during the 1953 championship and was a regular member of the starting fifteen for the next few seasons until his retirement after the 1957 championship. During that time he won one All-Ireland medal, one Leinster medal and one National League medal.

At club level Dixon was a seven-time county championship medalist with St Aidan's.

References

1930 births
2003 deaths
All-Ireland Senior Hurling Championship winners
St Aidan's hurlers
Wexford inter-county hurlers